The saz semai (also spelled in Turkish as saz sema'i, saz sema-i, saz sema i, saz semaī, saz semâ'î, sazsemai, saz semaisi, or sazsemaisi and in the Arab world as samâi) is an instrumental form in Ottoman classical music. It was typically the closing movement of a fasıl (i.e. suite). The saz semai is metered and typically uses the usul (rhythmic structure) called aksak semai.

A saz semai is typically in 4 movements, called hane (lit. "house"), each movement followed by a teslim (refrain).
The teslim and the first three hane are usually in rhythm structure 10/8, unlike the fourth hane which will be in 6/4.

Common Saz Semaisi

Some Saz Semaisi are very known and played in the all makam music area (From Greece to Iraq, and from Iraq to Morocco).
Here a few of them :

Samâi al Thakil - also called : Arap saz semai. This samai is in makam Bayati.
Samâi Al-Aryan - also called : Samâi Bayati.
Samâi Shad Araban - Shet Araban Saz Semaisi. Composed by Tanburi Cemil Bey.
Samâi Husseyni. Composed by Tatyos Efendi. 
Samâi Nahawand - Nihavend Saz Semaisi. Composed by the son of Tanburi Cemil Bey : Mas'ud Cemil Bey.

Saz Semai 's Composers 

Tanburi Cemil Bey was a noted composer of saz semai.
Ismail Hakki Bey
Misirli Ibrahim Effendi

Bibliography

Walter Feldman : "Music of the Ottoman court : Makam, composition in the early Ottoman instrumental repertoire" ; Intercultural Music Studies, 1996.

External links
Saz semai page
Saz semai page

See also
Sama'i
Yürük semai

Turkish music
Turkish words and phrases
Musical forms
Forms of Turkish makam music
Forms of Ottoman classical music